Al-Maqasid (the goals, the purposes) is a guide to Islam written by Imam Shatibi in his book "Al-mowafaq'at". It covers purposes of Islamic faith, Zakat (charity tax), pilgrimage or even of the Qur'an's and Sunnah's text, as well as frequently asked questions and can be used as a primer for students of Islam. Newer editions contain essays on modern issues. It is also known in English as the Manual of Islam and is one of the easier to understand translated works on Islam.

See: Maqasid

References

External links 
KVision Books, Al-Maqasid

Sunni literature